The 2023 season is Tampines Rovers's 28th season at the top level of Singapore football and 78th year in existence as a football club. The club will also compete in the Singapore League Cup, the Singapore Cup, and the AFC Cup.

Squad

Singapore Premier League

U21

Women (JSSL Tampines)

Coaching staff

Transfers

In 

Pre-season

Mid-season

Loan Return 

Pre-season

Note 1: Shah Shahiran to return in Feb 2023 after completion of NS

Out
Pre-season

Loan Out

Mid-season

Extension and retained

First Team

U21

Friendlies

Pre-season 

Tampines Rovers

JSSL Tampines Rovers

U21

In-season

Team statistics

Appearances and goals
 19 Mar 2023

Competitions

Overview

Singapore Premier League

AFC Cup

Group stage

Singapore Cup

Group

Competition (Women's Premier League)

Women's Premier League

League table

Competition (U21)

Stage 1
All 8 teams will be each other in a round robin format before breaking into 2 groups for another 3 matches. A total of 10 matches will be played thru the season.

 League table

Stage 2

 League table

Competition (U17)

U17 League

League table

See also 
 2012 Tampines Rovers FC season
 2013 Tampines Rovers FC season
 2014 Tampines Rovers FC season
 2015 Tampines Rovers FC season
 2016 Tampines Rovers FC season
 2017 Tampines Rovers FC season
 2018 Tampines Rovers FC season
 2019 Tampines Rovers FC season
 2020 Tampines Rovers FC season
 2021 Tampines Rovers FC season
 2022 Tampines Rovers FC season

Notes

References 

Tampines Rovers FC
Tampines Rovers FC seasons
2023 in Asian association football leagues
2023
1